Small Mercies were an Australian alternative rock band from Brisbane, Queensland.

Small Mercies may also refer to:

Music
 Small Mercies (album), a 1983 album by Norwegian group Fra Lippo Lippi
 Small Mercies, a 1990 EP by Australian band Huxton Creepers
 Small Mercies: A Boy After War, a 1997 memoir by Canadian writer and journalist Ernest Hillen
 "Small Mercies", a song by the New Zealand band The Mutton Birds from their 1999 album Rain, Steam and Speed
 "Small Mercies", a song by Lemon Kittens from their 1980 album We Buy a Hammer for Daddy
 "Small Mercies", a song by The Ghost of a Thousand from their 2009 album New Hopes, New Demonstrations

Other media
 "Small Mercies", a short story by Australian author Tim Winton appearing in the 2005 collection The Turning
 "Small Mercies", a segment in the 2013 film The Turning, based on the stories by Tim Winton
 Small Mercies, a 1998 novel by American writer Barbara McCauley
 Small Mercies, a 2000 drama by Australian writer Ailsa Piper
 Small Mercies: Journeys in Africa's Disputed Nations, a 1993 publication by Jeremy Harding
 "Small Mercies", a season 3, two-part episode of the British TV series The Cops
 "Small Mercies", a season 6 episode of The Flying Doctors
 "Small Mercies", a series 12 episode of Midsomer Murders
 "Small Mercies", a season 5 episode of Black Jack Justice

See also
 "Small Mercies, Sweet Graves", a 2005 single by the Australian group Schvendes